Antsla is a town in Võru County, southern Estonia, it is the administrative centre of Antsla Parish.

Antsla borough was renamed town of third rank by Konstantin Päts from 1 May 1938. The settlement is known since 1405. The town has a furniture manufacturing.

Antsla is situated on the Valga–Pechory railway, but since 2001 the train traffic on the line is inactive.

Notable people
Aimar Altosaar (born 1959), sociologist and politician
Teo Krüüner (born 1943), military major general
Maarja Nummert (born 1944), architect 
Vilja Toomast (born 1962), politician
Vahur Kersna (born 1962), journalist
Urmas Välbe (born 1966), cross-country skier
Andrus Värnik (born 1977), javelin thrower

Gallery

References

Cities and towns in Estonia
Populated places in Võru County
Former municipalities of Estonia